Cider with Rosie is a British television film of 1998 directed by Charles Beeson, with a screenplay by John Mortimer, starring Juliet Stevenson, based on the 1959 book of the same name by Laurie Lee.

The film was made by Carlton Television for ITV and was first broadcast in Britain on 27 December 1998. It was broadcast in the US as the second episode of Series 28 of Masterpiece Theatre and was later issued as an ITV Studios DVD.

Plot
The film is about the poet Laurie Lee's childhood and youth, between the ages of four and twenty-one, growing up in the Cotswold village of Slad, Gloucestershire, in the years following the First World War. It follows the ending of the traditional English village way of life, with the coming of motor cars and electricity, the death of the local squire, and the influence of the church ebbing away. As part of that breaking-down process, Lee's father abandons his family, leaving his wife to bring up eight children. One theme is Lee's awakening sexuality, as he grows older, and the title refers to his first flirtation, with a village girl called Rosie.

The main action of the film ends before Lee sets off on his early travels, which are dealt with in As I Walked Out One Midsummer Morning.

Videohound says of the film "Laurie's childhood consists of school, church, village festivals, eccentric relations and neighbors, and the usual childhood tribulations".

Production
John Mortimer and Laurie Lee had been friends from the 1950s on. Soon after Lee's death in 1997, Mortimer spoke at a memorial service for Lee and then turned his friend's autobiographical book Cider with Rosie into a screenplay, persuading Carlton Television to produce it. Charles Beeson was appointed as Director.

Lee's home village of Slad was found to have changed too much since the 1920s to be used as the main film location, with conservatories added to cottages and other modern alterations. In its place another village, Sapperton, near Cirencester, was used for filming most of the outdoor scenes, with the main street gravelled to overcome the out-of-character 1990s road surface. Several other Cotswold villages and the town of Stroud were also used as locations, as was Clevedon in Somerset, while Lee's final home in Slad, Rose Cottage, became the film location for the Slad village pub.

Juliet Stevenson was cast to play the pivotal character of Lee's mother, Annie, and she read the late Mrs Lee's letters in preparation for the role. Laurie Lee's own voice, recorded in 1988, was used for the narration, which gave the film extra impact, and the scriptwriter's daughter Emily Mortimer was cast as the mad Miss Flynn.

Casting director Pippa Hall gave a small boy, William Moseley, a walk-on part in the film, and seven years later she remembered him and cast him as Peter Pevensie in The Lion, the Witch, and the Wardrobe (2005).

Reception
Country Life said in its review

Valerie Grove, John Mortimer's biographer, later wrote of Emily Mortimer as "ethereally haunting as mad Miss Flynn, who drowns in the village pond."

Cast
Laurie Lee as Narrator, voice only 
Juliet Stevenson as Annie Lee
Dashiell Reece	as Laurie Lee (boy)
Joe Roberts as Laurie Lee (teenager)
Brad Simmons as Laurie Lee (older)
Angela Pleasence as Crabby
David Troughton as Uncle Sid
Margery Withers as Granny Trill
Freda Dowie as Granny Wallon
Grant Masters as Father Lee
Robert Lang as the Squire
Emily Mortimer as Miss Flynn
Hugh Lloyd as Joseph Brown
Con O'Neill as Uncle Ray
John Light as Harold 
Katharine Page as Hannah Brown
Lia Barrow as Rosie Burdock
Rupert Holliday-Evans as Deserter
Amanda Boxer as Miss Biggs
Clare Clifford as Spinster
Stephen Critchlow as Fred Bates
Elizabeth Kelly as Miss Pimbury
William Moseley as Boy
Ian Gargett as Jester

Book
Laurie Lee, Cider with Rosie (Penguin Books, 1959), 
Laurie Lee, Edge of Day: Boyhood in the West of England, first US edition, 1960

See also
1998 in British television

Notes

External links

British television films
British biographical films
Carlton Television
Stroud District
1998 television films
1998 films
1990s British films